Brandon Burton (born July 31, 1989) is an American football coach and former cornerback. Burton was selected with the 139th pick in the fifth round of the 2011 NFL Draft by the Minnesota Vikings. As a coach, he was the defensive backs coach for the Arizona Hotshots of the Alliance of American Football (AAF).

Early years
Burton attended Clear Creek High School in League City, Texas. He had 11 career interceptions.

College career
Burton attended the University of Utah, and was redshirted as a freshman in 2007. In 2008 as a redshirt freshman Burton played in 11 games, mainly on special teams, recording three tackles. As a sophomore in 2009, he started 12 of 13 games, recording 43 tackles and an interception.

Professional career

2011 NFL Draft

Burton was selected with the 139th overall pick in the fifth round of the draft by the Minnesota Vikings.

Minnesota Vikings
Burton was released by the Vikings on August 31, 2013 (along with 18 others) to get to a 53-man roster.

Buffalo Bills
Burton was signed by the Buffalo Bills on September 1, 2013.  He was released October 25, 2013.  He played in five games with the Bills, recording six total tackles during that span

Cincinnati Bengals
Burton was signed by the Cincinnati Bengals on December 30, 2013. He was waived on June 11, 2014.

Indianapolis Colts
Burton was claimed by the Indianapolis Colts on June 12, 2014. He was waived on August 4, 2014.

Coaching career
In 2019, Burton became the defensive backs coach of the Alliance of American Football's Arizona Hotshots.

References

External links
 
 Minnesota Vikings bio
 
 
 NFL combine profile

1989 births
Living people
People from League City, Texas
Players of American football from Texas
Sportspeople from Harris County, Texas
American football cornerbacks
Utah Utes football players
Minnesota Vikings players
Buffalo Bills players
Cincinnati Bengals players
Indianapolis Colts players
Arizona Hotshots coaches